Paul Steel (born 15 August 1970 in Whakatane, New Zealand) is a squash coach and a former professional player.
As a player, Paul Steel was a ten-time New Zealand national champion (1992–2001) and reached a career-high world ranking of World No.15. In 1991,92,95,97,99 and 2001 he was New Zealand representative in the World Team Squash Championships. In 1998 he was a member of New Zealand Commonwealth Games Team in Kuala Lumpur.

Since 1996 he has been six-time Swiss National League champion and three-time Swiss Cup champion.

Since 1996 he has been coaching in Switzerland. He coached Lars Harms (seven-time Swiss and two-time German champion), Reto Donatsch (two-time Swiss champion and Agnes Müller (seven-time Swiss champion).

In November 2011 he was added to the New Zealand Squash Hall of Fame.

References

External links
 

1970 births
New Zealand male squash players
Living people
Sportspeople from Whakatāne